Revadim (lit. terraces) is a kibbutz in southern Israel. Located in the southern Shephelah (Judean foothills) region, it falls under the jurisdiction of Yoav Regional Council.

History
Revadim was founded on 14 February 1947 as the fourth settlement of the Etzion Bloc in the Hebron Hills. It was established by the Tzabar pioneering group (distinct from the more recent Garin Tzabar) on tracts of land purchased by the Jewish National Fund in Ein Abu Zeid and Shuweika. While the land was being reclassified as musha'a [collectively owned land], the group cleared 100 dunams, 70 in Ein Abu Zeid and 30 in Wadi Abu Nofal, where the JNF owned a tract of mafruz [individually owned tracts]. Plans included the reclamation of 70 dunams in Wadi Abu Nofal and 150 in Dhahr al-Masatikh, which were acquired as part of a land exchange agreement.

On 13 May 1948, the village was razed to the ground by the Arab Legion. Survivors were taken prisoner by Jordan. The kibbutz was re-established in a new location on 28 November 1948. The released POWs were joined by immigrants from Bulgaria and other countries. The new Revadim was located on the land of the newly depopulated Palestinian village of Al-Mukhayzin, close to Al-Khayma.

Economy
The economy is based on tourism and small industry. It operates a guest rooms and a museum of antiquities. The Roman Glass Co. designs original jewellery for a worldwide market.

Landmarks
The kibbutz has a memorial for members who fell in the 1948 Arab–Israeli War. Tel Miqne-Ekron, an archaeological tell on the grounds of the kibbutz, is believed to be the site of the biblical city of Ekron. A  reconstructed Philistine street is open to visitors. The kibbutz operates the Ekron Museum of the History of Philistine Culture which displays finds from the excavations.

Archaeology

Prehistory
An archeological site in the Revadim region, other than Tel Miqne-Ekron, is at least 300 to 500 thousand years old (based on paleomagnetism analysis and uranium date series), and the archaeological finds there belong to the Late Acheulean. Numerous faunal remains were excavated at the site, as well as some flint tools with fat residue, suggesting that the bones (including those of straight-tusked elephant) belong to butchered game.

Tel Miqne, the Philistine city of Ekron

Tel Miqne-Ekron (Khirbat al-Muqanna') is one of the largest Iron Age (12th century–586 BC) sites in Israel. Archaeologists have discovered over 100 7th-century BC oil presses there, as  well as the Ekron Inscription from that same century, which identifies the site as Philistine Ekron.

The tell shows signs of occupation in the Chalcolithic period (4500–3100 BC) and throughout the Bronze Age (3100–1200 BC), but only becomes an important city in the 12th century BC with the arrival of the Philistines, one of the Sea Peoples. 
Once the Kingdom of Judah managed to take over the dominant position from the Philistines in the 10th century BC, Ekron was reduced in importance and size (from 10 acres to 5 acres, with the abandonment of the Lower City). The Assyrian conquest of the 8th century BC actually brought an economic revival, with a huge olive oil industry occupying 20% of the space within the city, and with a large number of loom weights found in the oil production rooms indicating that the population developed an active textile industry for the time outside the olive processing season. Ekron supplied Egypt and the Assyrian empire with 700 tons of olive oil a year, making it the largest olive oil industrial center in the ancient Middle East. After the Babylonian onslaught of the 6th century BC, the Philistine culture and identity disappeared.

The reconstructed Philistine street in the kibbutz, which can be visited only by previous appointment, features an oil press, a potter's wheel and a loom.

References

External links
Official website
Kibbutz Revadim Collection on the Digital collections of Younes and Soraya Nazarian Library, University of Haifa

Jewish villages depopulated during the 1948 Arab–Israeli War
Kibbutzim
Populated places in Southern District (Israel)
Populated places established in 1947
Populated places established in 1948
1947 establishments in Mandatory Palestine
1948 establishments in Israel